Lauren Senft (born May 16, 1987) is a Canadian retired ice dancer.

She competed on the junior level with Andrew Hallam before teaming up with Leif Gislason in 2002. The two are the 2004 Canadian junior national silver medalists. Senft and Gislason split after the 2007 Four Continents Championships. Senft then teamed up with American Augie Hill and competed with him during the 2007 and 2008 season. Senft announced her retirement from competitive skating on May 9, 2008.

Competitive highlights

With Hill

With Gislason 

 J = Junior level

Programs 
(with Gislason)

References

External links 
 
 Leif and Lauren's Official Website
 Skate Canada Profile
 Care to Ice Dance: Senft & Gislason

Canadian female ice dancers
1987 births
Living people